Catablema is a genus of cnidarians belonging to the family Pandeidae.

The species of this genus are found in Subarctic regions.

Species:

Catablema multicirratum 
Catablema vesicarium 
Catablema vesicarum

References

Pandeidae
Hydrozoan genera